Nang Ngumiti ang Langit (/) is a 2019 Philippine drama television series starring Sophia Reola. The series premiered on ABS-CBN's PrimeTanghali noontime block and worldwide via The Filipino Channel from March 25 to October 18, 2019, replacing Playhouse (Philippine TV series), and was replaced by Rosalinda (Mexican TV series) in the Philippines.

Series overview

Episodes

Season 1 (2019)
             

Episodes notes

References

Lists of Philippine drama television series episodes